The minister of employment, workforce development and disability inclusion is the minister of the Crown in the Canadian Cabinet who is responsible for Employment and Social Development Canada, the Government of Canada department that oversees programs such as employment insurance, the Canada pension plan, old age security, and Canada student loans.

History 
The ministerial responsibility for employment has its origins in the October 1, 1966 cabinet reshuffle, when Jean Marchand's portfolio was renamed from Minister of Immigration and Citizenship to Minister of Manpower and Immigration, Along with this change, minister Marchand was tasked by Prime Minister Lester Pearson to draft a White paper to renew Canada's immigration policy. Pearson wanted to removed all discriminatory clauses remaining in Canada's immigration regulations, and instead facilitate the immigration of qualified workers from Asia. 

The following year, Canada introduced its first point system to rank potential immigrants for eligibility. It originally consisted of 9 categories: education, occupation, professional skills, age, arranged employment, knowledge of English and/or French, relatives in Canada and “personal characteristics”. To qualify for immigration 50 points out of 100 were necessary in 1967.

In 1977, the portfolio was renamed Minister of Employment and Immigration, a move that reflected the importance of attracting and retaining economic immigrants for Canadian governments in the 1980s and 1990s.

On 12 July 1996, the office of the Minister of Employment and Immigration was abolished and replaced with the office of Minister of Human Resources Development. The portfolio for immigration was transferred to the office of Minister of Citizenship and Immigration following the reorganization of the government and formation of the department for Citizenship and Immigration Canada.

On February 6, 2006, Prime Minister Stephen Harper transferred the responsibilities of the Minister of Social Development into this portfolio. Although the legislated names did not change, in accordance with this amalgamation the Minister was for a while styled the Minister of Human Resources and Social Development and the department operated as Human Resources and Social Development Canada. This ceased on October 30, 2008, and the name returned to the legislated one.

In 2015, the Employment portfolio was merged into the expanded ministry of Employment, Workforce, and Labour. 

In 2019, following the 2019 Canadian federal election, the portfolio was split between the Minister of Labour Employment, Workforce Development and Disability Inclusion, with Carla Qualtrough being appointed the new minister on November 20.

List of ministers

Notes

Further reading
 

 
Employment Workforce And Labour
Labour relations in Canada